The Knife of the Party is a black-and-white short film starring Shemp Howard. The comedy was filmed at Van Beuren Studios and released by RKO Radio Pictures on February 16, 1934.

Shemp Howard and His Stooges
Shemp Howard makes an odd appearance as the lead stooge of four smack-around stooges. This act was presumably either a casting decision by the filmmakers or a short-lived act put together by Shemp. Shemp had been the original second stooge with Moe as First and Kenneth Lackey as the original third stooge. Three Stooges Shemp later left the act to be replaced by his brother Curly Howard, then returned after Curly retired in the wake of a series of strokes.

This feature appears on the Three Stooges DVD The Three Stooges: Greatest Hits and Rarities.

Cast 
 Lillian Miles - Donna
 Jack Good - Walter Brown
 Shemp Howard and his Stooges
 James Fox - Stooge
 Charles Senna - Stooge
 The Girl Friends - Singing Trio
 Gertrude Mudge - Mrs. Dora
 Leo Kennedy - bit role
 Rogers & Anthony - bit roles
 Bill Lawley - bit role
 Eddie Roberts - bit role
 Sybil Byrne - bit role

Music
The songs, by Harold Spina (music) and Johnny Burke (lyrics), include "Whistle While You Work" (not to be confused with the song made famous three years later in Walt Disney's animated film Snow White and the Seven Dwarfs).

References

External links 
 The Knife of the Party at IMDB
 The Knife of the Party at threestooges.net

1934 films
American black-and-white films
RKO Pictures short films
Films directed by Leigh Jason
1934 comedy films
American comedy short films
1930s American films